Kati Sar may refer to:
 Kati Sar, Bandpey-ye Sharqi
 Kati Sar, Lalehabad